The State Planning Commission (SPC) (German: Staatliche Plankommission) was a central state authority of the GDR Council of Ministers for planning, coordinating and proportional development of all sectors of the economy, public education and other areas of public life in the districts and for solving the most important economic tasks. In the central administrative economy of the GDR, it was responsible for the coordination, elaboration and control of the medium-term perspective plans (five-year plan) and the annual economic plans derived from them.The chairmen of the State Planning Commission had ministerial rank.

Heinrich Rau was the first chairman of SPC in 1950–1952.

Overview 

The State Planning Commission emerged from the Ministry of Planning in 1950. 

The state-owned enterprises, agricultural production cooperatives, etc. — each had to defend their plans in front of the planning commission responsible for them. The companies had to regularly document the implementation of the planned services with a large number of plan indicators. Monitoring the fulfillment of the plan was carried out at all levels in parallel by the party organs of the Socialist Unity Party of Germany, which were authorized to issue instructions to the state leaders.

The annual national economic plan passed by the People's Chamber had the force of law. Verifiable violations of the plan discipline could lead to sanctions (fines) for the company. Since almost all company leaders were also members of the Socialist Unity Party of Germany, they could be expelled from the party as a result of not delivering of the state plans.

At the intergovernmental level, the SPC coordinated the plans of the GDR with the countries of the Comecon Block. For this purpose the East German government agreements were concluded within the framework of socialist economic integration.

The SPC was based in the former building of the Prussian Landtag (state parliament) at the address Leipziger Straße 5–7 in East Berlin's Mitte district .

References 

1950 establishments
Economic planning
Economy of East Germany